Richard Jennings, who attended Coolidge High School in Washington, D.C., was a college football player at the University of Maryland, College Park, and a professional football player for the Oakland Raiders (three times), the Tampa Bay Buccaneers (two times), and the San Francisco 49ers. In 1976, he was drafted by the Raiders, but was claimed by the Buccaneers off waivers. Claimed by the Bucs on a Tuesday and waived again that Thursday, his two days set the record for the shortest time spent with the club. He then returned to the Raiders, and averaged 26.1 yards on 16 kick returns for the eventual Super Bowl XI champions before suffering a knee injury that required season-ending surgery. In the 1977 offseason, he passed through the Raiders, Green Bay Packers, and New Orleans Saints organizations, being waived by each, before being again claimed by the Buccaneers. After being waived a second time by the Buccaneers without ever playing a single down, Jennings played with the 49ers, and with the Raiders for a third stint. After the NFL, Jennings served as Sacramento School Board Member, and runs the Center for Fathers and Families, an organization that assists fatherless families. He has also counseled troubled NBA player Ron Artest.

Political Career
In June 2014, Jennings was elected to the Sacramento City Council serving District 7.  Jennings' campaign was supported by Region Builders and the Sacramento Chamber of Commerce.

References

Maryland Terrapins football players
Oakland Raiders players
Tampa Bay Buccaneers players
San Francisco 49ers players
1953 births
Living people
American athlete-politicians
Players of American football from Houston
Sacramento City Council members